Vladimir Abramovich Rokhlin ( Russian: Влади́мир Абра́мович Ро́хлин) (23 August 1919 – 3 December 1984) was a Soviet mathematician, who made numerous contributions in algebraic topology, geometry, measure theory, probability theory, ergodic theory and entropy theory.

Life
Vladimir Abramovich Rokhlin was born in Baku, Azerbaijan, to a wealthy Jewish family. His mother, Henrietta Emmanuilovna Levenson, had studied medicine in France (she died in Baku in 1923, believed to have been killed during civil unrest provoked by an epidemic). His maternal grandmother, Clara Levenson, had been one of the first female doctors in Russia. His maternal grandfather Emmanuil Levenson was a wealthy businessman (he was also the illegitimate father of Korney Chukovsky, who was thus Henrietta's half-brother).  Vladimir Rokhlin's father Abram Veniaminovich Rokhlin was a well-known social democrat (he was imprisoned during Stalin's Great Purge, and executed in 1941).

Vladimir Rokhlin entered Moscow State University in 1935. His advisor was Abraham Plessner. He volunteered for the army in 1941, leading to four years as a prisoner of a German war camp. During this time he was able to hide his Jewish origins from the Nazis. Rokhlin was liberated by the Soviet military in January 1945. He then served as a German language translator for the 5th Army of the Belorussian front.  In May 1945 he was sent to a Soviet 'verification camp' for former prisoners of war. In January 1946 he was transferred to another camp to determine if he was an "enemy of the Soviet." Rokhlin was cleared in June 1946 but was forced to remain in the camp as a guard. Due to intercession by mathematicians Andrey Kolmogorov and Lev Pontryagin, he was released in December 1946 and allowed to return to Moscow, after which he returned to mathematics.

In 1959 Rokhlin joined Leningrad State University as a faculty member. He died in 1984 in Leningrad. His students include Viatcheslav Kharlamov, Yakov Eliashberg, Mikhail Gromov, Nikolai V. Ivanov, Anatoly Vershik and Oleg Viro.

Work
Rokhlin's contributions to topology include Rokhlin's theorem, a result of 1952 on the signature of 4-manifolds. He also worked in the theory of characteristic classes, homotopy theory, cobordism theory, and in the topology of real algebraic varieties.

In measure theory, Rokhlin introduced what are now called Rokhlin partitions. He introduced the notion of standard probability space, and characterised such spaces up to isomorphism mod 0. He also proved the famous Rokhlin lemma.

Family
His son Vladimir Rokhlin, Jr. is a well-known mathematician and computer scientist at Yale University.

Rokhlin's uncle was Korney Chukovsky, a well-known Russian poet, most famous for his popular children's books.

See also
Gudkov's conjecture

Notes

References

External links

1919 births
1984 deaths
20th-century Russian mathematicians
Soviet mathematicians
Jewish scientists
Russian Jews
Soviet prisoners of war
Jewish concentration camp survivors
Topologists
Algebraic geometers
Moscow State University alumni
Scientists from Baku
Academic staff of Saint Petersburg State University
Prisoners and detainees of the Soviet Union
Russian Ashkenazi Jews

pt:Vladimir Rokhlin